is a Japanese idol group, formed in late April 2015 under the umbrella of Hello! Project. It is currently composed of twelve members. Their sister group was Magnolia Factory.

History

2015: Formation 
On April 29, the group was announced by Japanese media as a new Hello Pro Kenshusei unit, and confirmed through Hello! Project Station.  Initially the group consisted of six members: Risa Ogata, Riko Yamagishi, Kisora Niinuma, Ami Tanimoto, Yumeno Kishimoto and Kiki Asakura.

The group first performed at the Hello Pro Kenshūsei Happyōkai 2015 ~ Haru no kōkai jitsuryoku shindan tesuto ~ on May 4.

On August 8, during the Hello! Project 2015 Summer concert, Riko Yamagishi was announced as the leader of Tsubaki Factory, while Risa Ogata was announced as the group's sub-leader.

2015–16: Indies and New Members 
On September 6, 2015, Tsubaki Factory released their first indie single "Seishun Manmannaka!".

On December 31, Tsubaki Factory released their second indie single "Kedakaku Sakihokore!".

On May 18, 2016, Tsubaki Factory released their first extended play, Tsubaki Factory Sound + Vision Vol.1.

On August 13, it was announced at a Tsubaki Factory fan club event that Hello Pro Kenshuusei members Mizuho Ono, Saori Onoda, and Mao Akiyama had joined the group as new members. The new nine-member line-up debuted on September 4 at Hello! Project Kenshūsei Happyōkai 2016 9gatsu ~Singing!~, where it was announced by Hello! Project advisor Shimizu Saki that Tsubaki Factory would finally make their major debut in January 2017.

2017: Major debut 
Tsubaki Factory released their major debut single, "Hatsukoi Sunrise / Just Try! / Uruwashi no Camellia" on February 22, 2017.

Tsubaki Factory released their second major single, "Shuukatsu Sensation / Waratte / Hana Moyou" on July 26.

On November 9, it was announced that Tsubaki Factory had won a Newcomer Award from the 50th Japan Cable Awards; they were presented their award at the ceremony on December 4.

It was announced on November 16 that Tsubaki Factory had won a Newcomer Award at the 59th Japan Record Awards. At the ceremony on December 30, they were presented with their award and were later announced as the winners of the Best Newcomer Award out of three other artists.

2018–present: Continued success, Ogata's departure and new members 
Tsubaki Factory released their third major single "Teion Yakedo / Shunrenka / I Need You ~Yozora no Kanransha~" on February 21, 2018. 

On July 18, Tsubaki Factory released their fourth single, "Date no Hi wa Nido Kurai Shower Shite Dekaketai / Junjou cm / Kon'ya Dake Ukaretakatta".

On September 21, it was announced that Tsubaki Factory would sing Japanese covers of the opening and ending themes for the DreamWorks animated TV series Trolls: Sing, Dance, Hug! which began airing on TV Tokyo on October 3.

The group released their first studio album, First Bloom, on November 14.

On February 27, 2019, the group released their fifth single, "Sankaime no Date Shinwa / Fuwari, Koi Dokei".

On January 15, 2020, Tsubaki Factory released their sixth single, "Ishiki Takai Otome no Dilemma / Dakishimerarete Mitai".

The group released their seventh single, "Dansha-ISM / Ima Nanji?", on September 30.

On October 8, Risa Ogata went on voluntary suspension from the group following several leaked posts from her private social media account. On December 28, it was announced that Ogata would leave the group.

On January 20, 2021, it was announced Tsubaki Factory and labelmates Juice=Juice would be holding a joint new member audition.

On July 7, it was announced through Hello! Project Station that Hello! Project "Juice=Juice" "Tsubaki Factory" Goudou Shin Member Audition winners Yuumi Kasai, Shiori Yagi, Marine Fukuda and Hello Pro Kenshuusei member Runo Yofu have joined the group as new members.

On September 7, 2022, Kiki Asakura announced that she would be graduating from Tsubaki Factory and Hello! Project in the spring of 2023. The graduation date was later announced to be on April 2.

Members

Current
 – Leader
 – Sub-leader

Former

Timeline 

Blue (vertical) = Indie singles
Red (vertical) = Major singles
Green (vertical) = Studio albums

Discography

Studio albums

Singles

Awards and nominations

Japan Record Awards 

The Japan Record Awards is a major music awards show held annually in Japan by the Japan Composer's Association.

|-
|rowspan=2| 2017
|rowspan=2| Camellia Factory
| New Artist Award
| 
|-
| Best New Artist Award
| 
|}

References

External links 
 

2015 establishments in Japan
Hello! Project
Hello! Project groups
Japanese electropop groups
Japanese girl groups
Japanese idol groups
Japanese pop music groups
Musical groups established in 2015
Musical groups from Tokyo